Nagyberény is a village in Somogy county, Hungary.

History
According to László Szita the settlement was completely Hungarian in the 18th century.

External links 
 Street map (Hungarian)

References 

Populated places in Somogy County